The 2014 Conference USA Football Championship Game, held on December 6 of that year at Joan C. Edwards Stadium in Huntington, West Virginia, determined the 2014 football champion of Conference USA (C-USA), on December 6. The game featured the Marshall Thundering Herd, winners of the conference's East Division, hosting the West Division champion Louisiana Tech Bulldogs.

Under C-USA rules, the championship game would be played at the home stadium of the team with the best record in conference play.

History
In the 2013 Championship Game Rice defeated Marshall, 41-24 in Houston, Texas.

After the 2014 Conference USA realignment, C-USA added two new members for the 2014 season after losing three members, including East Carolina, to the American Athletic Conference.

After the 2014 season, this was the tenth C-USA championship game, and was played in West Virginia for the first time.

Teams

West Division Champions

Louisiana Tech entered the championship game with a record of 8–4 and went 6–0 in conference play until November 22, 2014, against newcomers Old Dominion Monarchs. The loss to the Monarchs brought Rice back to compete for the division title. Louisiana Tech defeated Rice in their last regular season game, which brought the Bulldogs to their first conference championship game in program history.

East Division Champions

Marshall entered the championship game with a record of 11–1 after winning all non-conference games and all of their conference games except for conference foe Western Kentucky. Marshall trailed Middle Tennessee in the East Division standings, until they faced on October 15, 2014.  Marshall defeated the Blue Raiders 49–24, moving the Thundering Herd to the top of the division. Marshall continued to storm through the rest of their schedule and was crowned East Division Champs after defeating defending champions, Rice on November 15, 2014 in Huntington.

This was Marshall's second appearance in the Conference USA Championship series in back–to–back years. Marshall hosted the championship game in Huntington, WV on December 6, 2014, marking the first time the Conference USA Championship was played in Huntington.

Scoring summary

References

Championship
Conference USA Football Championship Game
Louisiana Tech Bulldogs football games
Marshall Thundering Herd football games
Conference USA Football Championship Game
Conference USA Football Championship Game